Masak Hijau bananas are triploid banana cultivars from Malaysia. It is a member of the commercially important Cavendish banana subgroup. It is a popular banana cultivar in Southeast Asia and the West Indies.

It is also known widely (and erroneously) as Lacatan in Latin America and the West Indies, but should not be confused with the Philippine cultivar Lakatan. Other common names include Monte Cristo, Giant Fig, Bungulan, and Mestiça, among others.

Description

It produces bunches consisting of 6 to 12 hands, each with 12 to 20 fingers. The fruits ripen when the skin is light green to yellow-green, like other Cavendish cultivars.

Taxonomy
The Masak Hijau banana is a triploid (AAA) cultivar of the Cavendish banana subgroup. Its official designation is Musa acuminata (AAA Group) 'Masak Hijau'.

Masak Hijau is also erroneously called "Lacatan" in Latin America and the West Indies. To avoid confusion with the true Lakatan bananas from the Philippines, the latter is usually spelled with a 'k' in botanical literature, while Masak Hijau is usually spelled with a 'c' (Lacatan) or simply called "Jamaican Lacatan".

Other common names for the cultivar in Southeast Asia include "Pisang Buai" and "Pisang Embun Lumut" in Malaysia; "Pisang Ambon Lumut" in Indonesia; "Bungulan" or "Bongolan" in the Philippines; "Kluai Hom Kiau" in Thailand; "Thihmwe in Myanmar; and "Chuoi Tieu Cao #1" in Vietnam. In the Americas it is also known as "Monte Cristo" in Puerto Rico; "Giant Fig", "Bout Rond", and "Congo" in the West Indies; and "Mestiça" in Brazil. In Oceania it is known as "Hamakua" in Hawaii; "Amoa Kauare" in the Cook Islands; and "Viemama" in Fiji.

See also
 Banana
 Banana Cultivar Groups
 Musa
 Musa acuminata
 Musa balbisiana

References

Banana cultivars